The 1963 Chico State Wildcats football team represented Chico State College—now known as California State University, Chico—as a member of the Far Western Conference (FWC) during the 1963 NCAA College Division football season. Led by sixth-year head coach George Maderos, Chico State compiled an overall record of 2–7 with a mark of 0–5 in conference play, placing last out of six teams in the FWC. The team was outscored by its opponents 238 to 174 for the season. The Wildcats played home games at College Field in Chico, California.

Schedule

Notes

References

Chico State
Chico State Wildcats football seasons
Chico State Wildcats football